"No Parking (On the Dance Floor)" is the title track from Midnight Star's fourth and most successful album, No Parking on the Dance Floor.  In the US, the song reached number 43 on  the R&B chart, number 44 on the dance chart, and number 81 on the Billboard Hot 100.

The song has been sampled by several artists since its 1983 release, including Sugar Ray's song from 2003, "Mr. Bartender (It's So Easy)". The basic melody was sampled by the Bar-Kays in their 1984 hit "Freakshow on the Dance Floor" and in Popula Demand's 1988 song "Don't Clock Me".

References

External links
 No Parking (On the Dance Floor) lyrics at Yahoo Music

1984 singles
Midnight Star songs
1983 songs
Songs about dancing
SOLAR Records singles